No One Lives is a 2012 American horror film directed by Ryuhei Kitamura. It stars Luke Evans and Adelaide Clemens. The film premiered at the 2012 Toronto International Film Festival on September 8, 2012, and had a limited release on May 10, 2013.

Plot
While traveling cross country, a couple (Betty, and an unidentified man, referred to as "Driver,") encounter a gang of robbers. The group, led by dedicated criminal Hoag, consists of Hoag's brother Ethan, his daughter Amber, girlfriend Tamara, Amber's boyfriend Denny, and the violent Flynn. Suspecting the couple to be wealthy and wanting to redeem himself for a robbery he botched earlier, Flynn kidnaps them and has Ethan interrogate them about accessing their money. However, Betty commits suicide by cutting her throat on a knife Ethan had against her neck, which leads to the Driver breaking out of his handcuffs and killing Ethan.

Meanwhile, Flynn, having brought the Driver's car to the group's hideout, finds a girl in the trunk of the vehicle. Amber, after watching a true crime show, realizes the girl is Emma Ward, a wealthy heiress who disappeared after 14 of her friends were murdered at a party, and the kidnapped man is the one responsible for the massacre. Following Hoag's orders, Denny and Tamara head to the gas station to contact Ethan, only to find his and Betty's bodies and the Driver missing. They bring Ethan's corpse back to their hideout and inadvertently bring the Driver along with them, who had been hiding in the cadaver.

The Driver begins his assault on the robbers by capturing Hoag, while Denny is injured by booby traps the Driver had set up previously. The Driver tortures Hoag, cutting off his ear as a trophy, and finally killing him by dropping him into a meat grinder. With the group's van blown up by the Driver, Denny volunteers to get their old jeep working, as he is bleeding out. Although he succeeds, the Driver shoves him into the open car engine, badly mangling his face and spraying Amber with blood, who was in the driver's seat. Amber flees, and the Driver pursues her. The others hear the noise and head to the barn to take the jeep. The Driver throws a scythe through Amber, piercing her lung. He leaves her to die when he realizes the rest of the gang is escaping. Nevertheless, Flynn accidentally hits Amber with the jeep when she stumbles onto the road.

After dropping Denny off at the hospital, Flynn, Tamara, and Emma head to a motel to stay the night. When Flynn uses the Driver's credit card to pay for a room, he inadvertently causes motel owner Harris to call the police as the Driver had previously checked himself into the same motel. The Driver himself also arrives at the motel and nearly strangles Tamara to death in the shower but stops when he hears Flynn shoot the sheriff responding to Harris' call. Flynn discovers Tamara, and when she startles him, he euthanatizes Tamara, which leads to Emma attempting to escape. Though Flynn manages to stop her, he is run over by the Driver in a police car. Emma flees into a nearby junkyard.

When the Driver confronts Emma, she beats him with a metal pipe until Flynn shoots the Driver in the chest with a shotgun. The Driver survives due to his Kevlar vest, leading to a fight between the two. Ultimately, Flynn manages to grab his weapon, but is knocked out by Emma before he can fire it. Emma, explaining she wants to be one who kills the Driver, attempts to shoot him, but the firearm fails to operate because a new shell had not been pumped into the chamber. Impressed, the Driver cuts out a tracking device he placed inside her stomach and announces that she is free. He then finishes Flynn off with a shotgun blast to the face and also shoots Harris for knowing his real name.

The next day, the Driver murders Denny in his hospital bed with a clipboard while disguised as a doctor. As he leaves, he notices Emma being wheeled into the hospital on a stretcher. He touches her arm before departing.

Cast
Luke Evans as Driver
Adelaide Clemens as Emma Ward
Lee Tergesen as Hoag
Derek Magyar as Flynn
America Olivo as Tamara
Beau Knapp as Denny
Lindsey Shaw as Amber
Brodus Clay as Ethan
Laura Ramsey as Betty
Gary Grubbs as Harris

Andrea Frankle, Rob Steinberg, Jake Austin Walker, and Dalton E. Gray portray the family who are killed by Flynn.

Release
The film premiered at the 2012 Toronto International Film Festival on September 8, 2012. It was planned for a worldwide release in January 2013, however that release date was scrapped when Anchor Bay Films picked up the distribution rights to the film, they will release the film theatrically in North America, the U.K, and Australia and handle the home video release across various platforms.
The film will  have a limited theatrical release in those countries and the new release date will be May 10, 2013. The film is Rated R for strong bloody violence, disturbing images, pervasive language, and some sexuality/nudity. On April 13, 2013, a red band trailer for the film was released. In the United States the film will be released in select cities like New York, Los Angeles, Chicago, San Francisco, Dallas, Philadelphia, Miami, Boston, Detroit, Houston and Baltimore.

Reception

Critical response
Review aggregation website Rotten Tomatoes has a 48% approval rating based on 40 reviews with an average score of 4.7/10. The film premiered at the 2012 Toronto International Film Festival on September 8, 2012 and has received early mixed reviews. One review from William Brownridge states "Completely pointless and full of terrible dialogue, No One Lives still manages to be one of the most entertaining films around. This is a film that is best enjoyed among a crowd of genre fans. Extremely violent and bloody, audiences will cheer as Driver eliminates the gang one after another. The title isn’t just a suggestion, it’s a rule, and watching the madness that explodes from the screen is sure to please crowds looking for non-stop action and bloody violence."
Another review from the Toronto Star states "While parts of it are deliberately campy, the low-budget production veers onto the amateurish and some of the jump cuts make it look like it was edited with a switchblade. Or make that a butter knife."
Another review from Shocktillyoudrop.com states
"Even if it’s nothing to write home about, at 78 minutes sans credits and with plenty of over-the-top carnage that will have you squirming, this is mindless entertainment done right. It gets the job done quickly and effectively before calling it a day. Sometimes that’s all one can ask for", and it gives the shock score a 6.

Box office
No One Lives opened on May 10, 2013 in 53 theatres and in its opening weekend grossed $47,800 for an average of $902 per theatre. As of May 19, 2013 the film has grossed $74,918. The budget for the film was an estimated $2,900,000. However, it has performed much better than other past WWE studios limited releases including The Day, Legendary, The Reunion and The Chaperone.

Home media
The film was released on DVD/Blu-ray on August 20, 2013.

References

External links
 
 
 
 

2012 films
2010s English-language films
American splatter films
2012 horror films
Films directed by Ryuhei Kitamura
WWE Studios films
2010s American films